St Margaret's Church or the Church of St Margaret of Antioch is a Church of England parish church in Barking, East London. The church is a Grade I listed building  built on a site dating back to the 13th century within the grounds of Barking Abbey, the ruins of a former royal monastery that was originally established in the 7th century. The building is dedicated to Margaret the Virgin.

History

Medieval
It originated as a chapel for local people within the grounds of Barking Abbey, to the south of the Abbey church. Its oldest part is the chancel, built early in the 13th century during the reign of King John. The building is said to have been made into a parish church in 1300 by Anne de Vere, abbess of the Abbey. Until the 1390s Barking formed a rectory, held by the Abbey and divided into two vicarages known as 'Northstrete' (probably funded by income from the Ilford area) and 'Southstrete' (serving the Abbey church). The area suffered severe flooding in the late 14th century, leading to financial difficulties and a merger of the two vicarages from 1398 onwards. A chaplain from the Abbey led worship. The present bell tower was added late in the 15th century.

Reformation
It remained a parish church when the Abbey was dissolved and the rectory and advowson devolved to the Crown, who initially leased it to the widow Mary Blackenhall for 21 years in 1540. In 1557 these were bought by Robert Thomas and Andrew Salter using money from the estate of William Pownsett of nearby Loxford, and granted to All Souls College, Oxford, in return for the vicar praying for the souls of Pownsett, his parents and benefactors every Sunday, giving 6 shillings and 8 pence amongst twenty poor people annually on the anniversary of Pownsett's death, paying the College an annual sum to maintain two poor scholars and only being absent from the parish 80 or fewer days a year. The College presented when the next vacancy occurred in 1560, but at the following one the Crown contested its right, though this was overturned via a lawsuit. Sir John Petre reconfirmed the 1557 grant in 1594, but dropped the requirement to pray for the dead. The right is now shared between All Souls College, Oxford, the Bishop of Chelmsford (in whose diocese it now falls) and the church's churchwardens.

17th century to 20th century
The church contains several memorials, including one to the 17th-century politician Charles Montagu. The explorer James Cook married Elizabeth Batts in the church on 21 December 1762. Ten years later the nave, chancel and sanctuary all had their ceilings plastered, though this was removed from the nave ceiling in 1842.

Charles Winmill and George Jack were involved in a restoration of the interior between 1929 and 1936. The building was Grade I listed in 1954. An extension was added along the south side late in the 20th century to provide an office, bookshop and refectory.

Present day
In the late 1970s the parish became part of a team parish covering Barking with Christ Church and St Patrick's. On 1 January 2017, St Patrick's and Christchurch each gained their own parishes, taken from the team Parish area, leaving St Margaret's with a smaller Parish.

St Margaret's parish is unusual in having three churchwardens rather than two.

In 2007, two small stones from remains of the old medieval London Bridge were joined together in a sculpture in front of St Margaret's church facing the Barking Abbey ruins as part of several public artworks placed in Barking Town Centre by artist Joost Van Santen.

The church is both Anglo-Catholic and open evangelical in tradition.

Notable clergy
Many vicars of Barking have gone on to become bishops. Hugh Jermyn was Bishop of Colombo 1871–1875 and Bishop of Brechin 1875–1903, and Primus of Scotland 1886–1901. Robin Smith, a curate from 1962, later became Bishop of Hertford.

Vicars of North Barking
 1315-????: Martinus
 1328-????: ???? De Ansi
 1335-???: ???? De Borton
 1373-????: Hugo Smith
 1385-????: Thomas Bene
 1395-????: John Sacombe

Vicars of South Barking
 1331-????: ??? De Cishampton
 1335-????: ??? De Hochetote
 1373-????: ??? ?Deautine/?Beautine

Vicars of Barking

 1398-????: John Makewye
 1403-????: Stephen Chamberlayne
 1438-????: John Willoghby
 1439-????: John Greening
 1462-????: Robert Walesis
 1486-????: Galf King
 1505-????: John Frothingham
 1511-????: John Long
 1524-1560: John Gregyll
 1560-????: Richard Tirwitt
 1584-????: Edward Edworth
 1587-????: Richard Wignall
 1620-????: Richard Hall
 c. 1649-1653: William Amys
 until 1654: Jonathan Bowles
 until 1660: Benjamin Way
 1660-1689: Thomas Cartwright; also Bishop of Chester from 1686.
 1689 - ??: Leopold Finch
 1697 - ??: John Chisenhale
 ?-?: Thomas Macken Fiddes
 ????-????: Lewis Owen
 ????-????: William Stephens
 before 1748: Peter Walkden
 1748 - ??: Francis Morice
 1751-??: Savage Tyndal
 1782- ???? Christopher Musgrave
 ????-????: Edmund Isham
 c. 1785: Peter Rashleigh
 1836-????: Robert Lidell
 c 1850 - ????: Henry Jeremiah Dyson
 c 1860 - ????: Henry Fortescue Seymour
 1870-1871: Hugh Willoughby Jermyn
 1871-1882: Alfred Blomfield
 1882-1888: John Richardson
 1888–1895: Hensley Henson; later Bishop of Hereford and Bishop of Durham
 1895-1903: Percy Montague Wathen
 1904-?1915: John Warmington Eisdell
 1925–1930: Leslie Hunter; later Bishop of Sheffield
 1947–1959: William Chadwick; later Bishop of Barking 
 1959–1965: Denis Wakeling; later Bishop of Southwell 
 1965–1977: James Roxburgh; later Bishop of Barking
 Patrick Allen Blair
 Paul Richard Thomas
 John Parsons
 Gordon Tarry
 2013–2019: Trevor Mwamba; previously Bishop of Botswana
 2021 - date: Mark Adams

References

External Links:

St Margaret's Church website

Church of England church buildings in the London Borough of Barking and Dagenham
13th-century church buildings in England
Grade I listed churches in London
Grade I listed buildings in the London Borough of Barking and Dagenham